Mary Adela Blagg  (17 May 1858 – 14 April 1944) was an English astronomer and was elected a fellow of the Royal Astronomical Society in 1916.

Biography 
She was born in Cheadle, Staffordshire, and lived her entire life there. Mary was the daughter of a solicitor, John Charles Blagg, and France Caroline Foottit. She trained herself in mathematics by reading her brother's textbooks. In 1875 she was sent to a finishing school in Kensington where she studied algebra and German. She later worked as a Sunday school teacher and was the branch secretary of the Girls' Friendly Society.

By middle age she became interested in astronomy after attending a university extension course, taught by Joseph Hardcastle, John Herschel's grandson. Her tutor suggested working in the area of selenography, particularly on the problem of developing a uniform system of lunar nomenclature. (Several major lunar maps of the period had discrepancies in terms of naming the various features.)

In 1905 she was appointed by the newly formed International Association of Academies to build a collated list of all of the lunar features. She worked with Samuel Saunder on this very tedious and lengthy task, and the result was published in 1913. Her work produced a long list of discrepancies that the association would need to resolve. She also performed considerable work on the subject of variable stars, in collaboration with Professor H. H. Turner. These were published in a series of ten articles in the Monthly Notices, in which the professor acknowledged that a large majority of the work had been performed by Mary Blagg. On 28 March 1906 Mary was elected to the British Astronomical Association at the proposal of Hardcastle.

After the publication of several research papers for the Royal Astronomical Society, she was elected as a fellow in January1916, after being nominated by Professor Turner. She was one of five women to be elected simultaneously, the first women to become Fellows of that society.

She worked out a Fourier analysis of Bode's Law in 1913, which was detailed in Michael Martin Nieto's book "The Titius-Bode Law of Planetary Distances." Her investigation corrected a major flaw in the original Law and gave it a firmer physical footing. However, her paper was forgotten until 1953, when it was found that her predictions had been validated by discoveries of new planetary satellites unknown at the time of publication.

In 1920, she joined the Lunar Commission of the newly formed International Astronomical Union. They tasked her with continuing her work on standardizing the nomenclature. For this task she collaborated with Karl Müller (1866–1942), a retired government official and amateur astronomer. (The crater Müller on the Moon was subsequently named after him.) Together they produced a two volume set in 1935, titled Named Lunar Formations, that became the standard reference on the subject.

During her life she performed volunteer work, including caring for Belgian refugee children during World War I. One of her favorite hobbies was chess. She was described in her obituary as being of "modest and retiring disposition, in fact very much of a recluse", and rarely attended meetings.

Honors 
The crater Blagg on the Moon is named after her.

Bibliography
M. A. Blagg, Collated List of Lunar Formations, Edinburgh, 1913.
M. A. Blagg and Karl Müller, Named Lunar Formations, London, 1935 — vol. 1, catalogue; vol. 2, maps.

References

External links
David Darling article.
Obituary notice.

1858 births
1944 deaths
People from Cheadle, Staffordshire
20th-century British astronomers
Selenographers
Fellows of the Royal Astronomical Society
Women astronomers
20th-century British women scientists